Vuelveme A Querer (Love me again) is the title of a Spanish-language telenovela produced by the Mexican television network TV Azteca. It stars Mariana Torres and Jorge Alberti as protagonists. It is a remake of Venezuelan telenovela Destino de Mujer in 1997, produced and broadcast by Venevision and starred by Sonya Smith and Jorge Reyes.

Cast

Main casts

Secondary casts

Trivia
This is the fourth of four telenovelas (Olvidarte Jamas, Acorralada, Pecados Ajenos) which Sonya Smith and Mariana Torres star as mother and daughter.
This is the first telenovela of Sonya Smith and Jorge Alberti in Mexico.

References

2009 telenovelas
2009 Mexican television series debuts
2009 Mexican television series endings
Mexican telenovelas
TV Azteca telenovelas
Mexican television series based on Venezuelan television series
Spanish-language telenovelas